This is a listing of vintage and modern covered bridges located in the U.S. state of Minnesota.

Bridges

Below is a list of some of the other historic covered bridges in Minnesota which were eventually destroyed, removed or altered.

References

External links
 

 
Minnesota covered bridges
Bridges, covered
Covered Bridges